System Center Service Manager is a software product by Microsoft to allow organizations to manage incidents and problems.  

Microsoft states that the product is compliant with industry best practices such as the Microsoft Operations Framework (MOF) and ITIL.

SCSM has integrated ITIL compliant fulfillment of service requests. Service requests are submitted by the end user in order to obtain information, access to a new application or the most common of all, password reset.

See also
 Microsoft Servers
 Microsoft System Center
 System Center Data Protection Manager
 System Center Operations Manager
 System Center Virtual Machine Manager
 Configuration management
 Windows Server Update Services
 SYDI

References

External links
 System Center Service Manager Build Numbers
 System Center Service Manager Documentation
 Official System Center Service Manager Blog

Windows Server System